Jules Louis Emanuel Roguin (17 September 1823, in Yverdon-les-Bains – 6 October 1908) was a Swiss politician and President of the Swiss Council of States (1864/1865 and 1872/1873).

External links 
 
 

1823 births
1908 deaths
People from Yverdon-les-Bains
Swiss Calvinist and Reformed Christians
Members of the Council of States (Switzerland)
Presidents of the Council of States (Switzerland)
Federal Supreme Court of Switzerland judges
Swiss military officers
19th-century Swiss politicians